Kenneth Laurence Baker (September 30, 1912 – August 10, 1985) was an American singer and actor who first gained notice as the featured singer on radio's The Jack Benny Program during the 1930s.

Film
Before he became a star, Baker sang as a member of the Vitaphone chorus at Warner Bros.

At the height of his radio fame, and after leaving the Benny show in 1939 (succeeded by Dennis Day, whose tenor voice was very similar to Baker's), he appeared in 17 film musicals, including Mr. Dodd Takes the Air (1937), At the Circus (1939), and The Harvey Girls (1946). He also starred in the 1939 movie version of Gilbert and Sullivan's The Mikado. He later co-starred with Mary Martin in the original Broadway production of Kurt Weill and Ogden Nash's One Touch of Venus (1943).

Radio
Baker first appeared on Jack Benny's weekly radio program on November 3, 1935, having been hired to replace singer Frank Parker. Parker had been very popular on the Benny program, and with his departure, it was widely believed that Benny would lose a large part of his audience; however, Kenny Baker is said to have won audiences over almost instantly, even surpassing Parker in popularity. Baker portrayed a high-voiced, innocent young man on the show, who would frequently cause the Jack Benny character frustration with his "silly" remarks.

Baker's final regular appearance on Benny's radio show aired on June 25, 1939, leaving the $3,000 per week job because he no longer wanted to play the character. He was subsequently replaced by singer Dennis Day. After his four-year stint on the Benny program, Baker returned to radio as a regular performer on Fred Allen's Texaco Star Theater program (1940–1942). He was also heard on Blue Ribbon Town (1943–1944) and Glamour Manor (1945–1947). He had his own programs, the Kenny Baker Show (1954) and SincerelyKenny Baker (1946). The latter was syndicated by the Frederick W. Ziv Company via electrical transcription.

Later years
After retiring from performing in the early 1950s, Baker became a Christian Science practitioner and motivational speaker and recorded a number of record albums of hymns for his church.

Death
Baker died of a heart attack in Solvang, California, August 10, 1985, aged 72.

Partial filmography
 King of Burlesque (1936)
 Mr. Dodd Takes the Air (1937)
 The King and the Chorus Girl (1937)
 Turn Off the Moon (1937)
 52nd Street (1937)
 The Goldwyn Follies (1938)
 At the Circus (1939) as Jeff Wilson
 The Mikado (1939)
 Hit Parade of 1941 (1940)
 Doughboys in Ireland (1943)
 Stage Door Canteen (1943)
 The Harvey Girls (1946)
 Calendar Girl (1947)

References

External links

Audio files
Best of Jack Benny Spotlight Podcast! 1935-11-03 – Kenny Baker's First Show! with new introduction.
Fred Allen Podcast 1940-10-02 (ep 01) Grab It Or Leave It – Kenny Baker's First Show with Fred Allen! with new introduction.

1912 births
1985 deaths
American male film actors
American male pop singers
American tenors
American male radio actors
American male musical theatre actors
American Christian Scientists
Donaldson Award winners
Male actors from California
People from the San Gabriel Valley
Traditional pop music singers
Texaco
20th-century American male actors
20th-century American singers
Decca Records artists
RCA Victor artists
20th-century American male singers